Hydroelectricity is currently China's largest renewable energy source and the second overall after coal.
China's installed hydroelectric capacity in 2015 was 356 GW, up from 172 GW in 2009, including 23 GW of pumped storage hydroelectricity capacity.
According to the International Hydropower Association China is the worlds largest producer of hydroelectricity in 2021. In 2018, hydropower generated 1,232 TWh of power, accounting for roughly 18% of China's total electricity generation.

Due to China's insufficient reserves of fossil fuels and the government's preference for energy independence, hydropower plays a big part in the energy policy of the country.
China's potential hydropower capacity is estimated at up to 400 GW. There is therefore considerable potential for further hydro development.

Hydroelectric plants in China have a relatively low productivity, with an average capacity factor of 31%, a possible consequence of rushed construction and the seasonal variability of rainfall. Moreover, a significant amount of energy is lost due to the need for long transmission lines to connect the remote plants to where demand is most concentrated.

Although hydroelectricity represents the largest renewable and low greenhouse gas emissions energy source in the country, the social and environmental impact of dam construction in China has been large, with millions of people forced to relocate and large scale damage to the environment.

Largest hydroelectric plants

Under construction

History
The Shilongba Hydropower Station is the first hydroelectric power plant in China. It was built in Yunnan province in 1912, with a capacity of 240 kW. Due to the subsequent period of political and social instability, little additional progress was made in power infrastructure in the country at that time. The total installed capacity before the Japanese occupation was only about 10 MW. During the Japanese occupation several large scale hydroelectric projects were built, and total capacity reached 900 MW. Energy infrastructure however suffered heavy damage during the second World War, and the operational capacity after the war was only about 580 MW.

After the Chinese Communist Revolution of 1949, a program of dam construction was initiated. However, most of these dams were built for irrigation and not intended to produce electricity. Moreover, construction was carried out mostly by unskilled peasants. During this period, the steady supply of cheap domestic coal hindered the development of hydroelectricity.
Installed hydroelectric capacity grew somewhat after the 1960s, with plants of growing size and complexity, reaching a total of 20 GW in 1980.

After completion of the Baihetan Dam in 2021, all planned large scale dams had been completed.

Environmental impact

Hydropower is considered a renewable and clean energy source. However large dams, such as the Three Gorges Dam or the Xiluodu Dam have had environmental impacts on the areas surrounding dam reservoirs. Typical problems have been erosion, flooding of farmland and destruction of fish breeding habitats.

Flooding of large areas for reservoirs also forced about 15 million people to be relocated since 1949.

See also 

 Renewable energy in China
 Solar power in China
 Wind power in China
 Geothermal power in China
 Bioenergy in China
 Renewable energy by country
 Electricity sector in China

References